Hostre is an urban-type settlement in the Pokrovsk Raion, Donetsk Oblast (province) of eastern Ukraine.   The population is

Demographics
Native language as of the Ukrainian Census of 2001:
 Ukrainian 28.59%
 Russian 71.41%

References

Urban-type settlements in Pokrovsk Raion